Pavel Aleksandrovich Otdelnov (19 June 1979 in Dzerzhinsk, USSR) is an artist working in painting, drawing, video, installations, and exploring such subjects as urban space, environment, Soviet history and historical memory.

Biography 
Pavel Otdelnov was born in the town of Dzerzhinsk Nizhny Novgorod Region, a major cluster of the Soviet chemical industry. In the 1930s, the artist’s family was employed at local chemical enterprises. Given its industrial background, Dzerzhinsk faced an economic decline and neglect after the collapse of the Soviet Union, which has served as one of the sources of imagery and subject matter for Otdelnov.
   
According to the artist, he has always dreamt of becoming an artist and began his creative practices already as a kid.  Having graduated an arts club and art school in his hometown, Otdelnov enrolled at the Nizhny Novgorod Art College, where from 1994 to 1999 he was instructed by Pavel Rybakov. His early exhibitions took place during that time: the group show Miezdunarodny Plener Malarski in Sławków, Poland in 1997, and a personal exhibition at the Peter’s House exhibition hall in Nizhny Novgorod in 1999. In 1999, he submitted as his graduation project the painting Cargo 200, based on the artist’s meetings and discussions with veterans of local wars. Otdelnov explains his goal then as creating an image of a person broken by war and unable to reintegrate into peaceful society.  For this graduation project, the artist spoke to soldiers who had returned from the Afghanistan and Chechen wars.

In 1999–2005, Otdelnov studied at V. Surikov Moscow State Academy Art Institute in Moscow in the Painting Department under instruction of Pavel Nikonov and Yuri Shishkov, where among his groupmates were Egor Plotnikov, Evgenia Buravleva, Dmitry Samodin, Maxim Smirennomudrensky, Nikolay Smirnov. In 2005, he presented the graduation project in the form of a Gospel-inspired series. The project was made in line with the traditions of his training studio which focused major attention on plastic craftsmanship: composition structure, rhythm, the painting plane, space. Otdelnov’s works from his student years are marked by the influence of the Soviet painting of the 1920s and 30s. 

From 2005 to 2007, he was a post-graduate student at Surikov Art Institute. In 2007, Otdelnov started a Livejournal.com blog, which became a most effective tool of self-education for him and where he posted reviews and essays on art and current exhibitions.

In 2014–2015, he studied at the Institute of Contemporary Art in Moscow. As part of the training program, Otdelnov created I Shop Therefore I Am, a work contemplating the mutual penetration of art and commerce and an homage to Barbara Kruger.

Style and technique 
Otdelnov is trained as an academic painter. The curriculum of the art college was based on studying the socialist realism art and had a major focus on painting from life. His works from his student and early years are marked by such influences as Pavel Nikonov, Nikolay Andronov and Andrey Vasnetsov. During that period Otdelnov’s output was primarily in the form of paintings. His works of the 2000s explore the formal aspects of painting: the properties of colors and materials, interrelation of dimensions, unconventional compositions. In 2009–2010, Otdelnov’s artistic vocabulary is gradually evolving: blocky pastose painting grows more refined and polished, the canvas space gets deeper, the expressive successions of color areas, textures and paint drips are subdued in favor of softer gradients.  The artist himself comments on this period of change as follows: For a long time, while I was studying, it was assumed that painting was self-sufficient: the paint and its movement on the plane, its traces left by the artist, the mass of the painting — were seen as valuable in their own right. Even if painting is still very important for me, I think I have moved away from this mindset to a degree.
In 2015 the artist begins to film videos, and in 2016 he exhibits photographs for the first time. 
In Otdelnov’s view, the painting as a medium is linked with the category of time. He compares his mode of perception with how timelapse footage works, which enables a disinterested perspective and detection of changes in familiar landscapes and mundane life: 

Otdelnov seeks to rethink the painting’s status, engage it not as a self-sufficient medium but as a part within installations. Starting from the mid-2010s, he creates large-scale artistic research projects (Promzona, Ringing Trace). As part of such projects and alongside videos, found objects and historical documents, paintings serve as a means to comprehend the past.
When describing Otdelnov’s language, art critics point out similarities in his techniques with Gerhard Richter, the Düsseldorf School of Photography, and the artists Pavel Nikonov, Semen Faĭbisovich, Michael Roginsky and Erik Bulatov. The artist himself also considers as important influences the Russian lyrical landscape artists of the 19th century, as well as Mario Sironi, Giorgio Morandi, Gregory Schneider, Jeremy Deller, Rachel Whiteread, Cyprien Gaillard.

Early work

Combine. Retrospective, 2007—2008 

In 2007, Otdelnov and Egor Plotnikov went on a creative journey to Western Siberia where for two weeks they observed the operations of the Novokuznetsk Iron and Steel Plant and West-Siberian Metal Plant, two industrial behemoths built during the Soviet industrialization. The trip was initiated by Pavel Nikonov as a continuation to the Soviet practice of creative travel assignments. The idea behind this particular trip was to reconceptualize the experience of artists who participated in expeditions to major national construction projects in the 1920s–30s: Alexander Drevin, Alexander Labas, Alexander Tyshler, Nadezhda Udaltsova, Alexander Shevchenko, and others. The resulting series of paintings by Otdelnov and Plotnikov based on photos and sketches from the trip were exhibited at Heritage gallery in May 2012. In Otdelnov’s words, that visit to Novokuznetsk enabled a view on the Soviet industrial architecture as ancient ruins, akin to the Baths of Caracalla or a Roman Forum, that apparently achieve reconciliation with the surrounding landscape and become its part.

Land. Sky, 2007—2008 
In 2007-2008 Otdelnov painted a series of five abstract landscapes where he amalgamated the inflection of the Russian lyrical landscapes from the 19th century and the expressive language of abstract painting. In his LiveJournal, the artist refers to Alexei Savrasov and Mark Rothko as the two main sources for the series Land. Sky.  Three of the five landscapes from it were exhibited at Art Sanatorium, an exhibition hosted by the Tretyakov Gallery in 2010. This was Otdelnov’s first attempt to present painting as part of an installation. The canvases were hung in a specially constructed isolated room with black walls, an invitation for the viewer to come inside and be surrounded with the acutely familiar Central Russia landscapes.

Google landscapes and urban outskirts 
Around the same time, Otdelnov begins working with images found on Google Maps or its satellite service (Highway, 2009; Highway II, 2010; the Color Fields series, 2010). Here, he seeks to contemplate the landscape from a removed perspective, whereby the computer screen acts as a filter to set a certain distance between the landscape and the artist. One of the notable influences on Otdelnov at the time was the Godfrey Reggio movie Koyaanisqatsi, with a minimalist score composed by Philip Glass.

In the 2010s the artist lived in Khimki near Moscow and travelled to his studio in the capital every day. During his commute Otdelnov was able to take in the landscapes of the Moscow outskirts and he spent his weekend wandering around residential areas or the big waste dump not far from his home. These observation practices resulted in the series titled Metro, 2009–2010; In Motion, 2010; and the painting Desert, 2010, where the artist addresses for the first time the motifs central to his subsequent art: the urban outskirts, landfills and abandoned plots.

Neon Landscape, 2012 
In the fall of 2012, Otdelnov had his first solo show in Moscow where he presents the painting series Neon Landscape (Agency. Art Ru Gallery). The paintings made in oil on canvas and on wood focused on the exploration of the nature of light. The setting of choice was airport terminals, passageways and runways, metro stations, and highways, and the main protagonist was artificial lighting — coalescing into lines that are usually disregarded as background and remain unseen, even if they actually guide our movement through urban space.

Urban outskirts and non-places

Inner Degunino, 2013—2014 
In 2013, Otdelnov began the series Inner Degunino, where he depicts Moscow’s residential areas and draws inspiration from the Zapadnoye Degunino District, situated near the Moscow Ring Road, comprising mostly industrial facilities and pre-fab mass housing of type P-44. According to the artist, his aim was to construct an image of the modern Russian landscape, uncover the features of our time usually unseen through the habitual optics. This is primarily about the deserted post-Soviet landscapes, with their power transmission lines stretching into the void, with the ubiquitous pre-fab panel housing, and the gloomy sky.  The author’s take on the architecture of residential areas with spot inclusions of industrial plants across the endless snowy expanse drew the attention of David Eliott, a curator of the 4th International Biennale for Young Art, which then featured Otdelnov’s paintings at the Biennale in the summer of 2014. The exposition garnered high praise from art critics and culture correspondents. 
In October 2014, Otdelnov exhibited the completed Inner Degunino series at a solo show at the Moscow Museum of Modern Art. Inner Degunino was featured in the top-50 most prominent art projects of 2014 according to the editorial board of AroundArt; was ranked 3rd in the readership survey for the best exhibition; and was nominated in 2015 for the Kandinsky Art Award in the Project of the Year category. 
The image of the artist’s painting Arc from the Inner Degunino project was used in 2014 on the album cover for a Nizhny Novgorod band, KernHerbst, where the artist’s brother Leonid Otdelnov is a member.

Mall, 2015—2016 

Otdelnov continued to explore the subject of post-Soviet urban outskirts in his project the Mall, dedicated to the shopping centers that emerged around residential areas of Russian cities in the well-off “noughties”. The artist depicts the bright boxes of malls surrounded with decrepit pre-fab panel houses as if they were “glitches” — visual artefacts caused by a software error. Mall was exhibited at Triumph gallery in late 2015. The preface to the exhibition gives the artist’s own account of why he turned to glitches: 
 
A year later, in November 2016, the series was exhibited at the exhibition Mall. The Time of Colorful Sheds organized as part of the Non-Places Programme run by Department of Research Art and hosted by Smena Center of Contemporary Culture in Kazan.
In 2015, Otdelnov’s contemplations on the notion of glitch in the post-Soviet landscape were presented at two other exhibition projects. In July 2015, he made a total installation for the exhibition Piece of Space Traversed by Mind at the New Wing of Gogol Museum on Nikitsky Boulevard: he painted a monochrome landscape on the walls with a snow field, gray sky, and power transmission line pilons, and the “glitch” was manifested in LEGO bricks suspended on thin wire. 
In 2015, Otdelnov also participated in Expanding Space. Art Practices in the Urban Environment, a project aimed at creative exploration of contemporary phenomena and features of Moscow, organized by V-A-C Foundation. Otdelnov proposed a large-scale object constructed with bright composite panels to be installed next to the Moscow Ring Road near the 81st kilometer. It employed the parallax effect to make the structure seem stably whole from one vantage point but, as the perspective shifts, to disintegrate into parts becoming fluid and unstable. This piece was meant to imitate abandoned or uncompleted mall projects that look like a disruption in the landscape and, at the same time, symbolize the volatility in the economy.

Russian Nowhere, 2020—2021 

The next project by Otdelnov that addressed the subject of post-Soviet wastelands and non-places was the Russian Nowhere, exhibited at Triumph gallery in 2021. The artist searched for imagery by traveling the country through Yandex and Google Street View. For the paintings he chose the most banal and typical images that could be taken anywhere in Russia. Next to the landscapes Otdelnov placed illuminated red-letter signs, fashioned after the ubiquitous shop signage. The sign texts were borrowed from online comments in such social media communities as The Beauty Of Blight, Birch Tree, Russian Death, etc.
Philosopher Svetlana Polyakova noted the extreme degree of dehumanization in the landscapes of this series: 

Following the exhibition at Triumph, the project was shown at the Yeltsin Centre in Ekaterinburg.
 
In 2021, The Village, an online media outlet, reported on a new coinage Otdelnovesque — referring to the state of alienation and despondency.

Environmental issues

Sand and landscapes of the Kazanka River flood plain , 2016—2017 
In 2016, as part of the Non-Places Program run by Department of Research Art, an interdisciplinary project in Moscow, Otdelnov went to Kazan for a residency at the Smena Center of Contemporary Culture. He met local environmental experts and activists who were trying to counter planned construction projects in the Kazanka River flood plain. While in residency, he shot the film Sand, and painted landscapes of the 
Kazanka River
.

Psychozoic Era, 2018—2019 

In 2018, Otdelnov further explored the environmental issues in a new film and installation, titled collectively the Psychozoic Era. The project depicted Russian industrial-waste storage facilities, their impacts on the environment and people.

Shitty Sea, 2019—2020 
In 2020, specially for the 8th Moscow International Biennale of Contemporary Art, Otdelnov made Shitty Sea, a project exploring the challenges of collection, sorting and recycling of waste, as well as the problem of the ever-proliferating landfills around Moscow. The artist planted GPS beacons into garbage bags and threw them out in different parts of Moscow to then track their movements. Eventually he visited the municipal landfills and waste sorting facilities where they ended up. The process and outcomes of this research is presented in the film The Trash Trip (2019), and the paintings Landfill Aleksndrov and Landfill Timokhovo (2019), MSW (2020), Rubbish and Waste Sorting (2020). In order to gain a deeper insight into waste sorting, Otdelnov took a job at one such facility. An account of his observations and conversations with other sorting workers are recorded in The Waste Sorter’s Diary.

Research projects

Promzona, 2015—2020 
For four years, from 2015 to 2020, Otdelnov was working on a large-scale project titled Promzona (Industrial Cluster). The project explores the history of the artist’s hometown of Dzerzhinsk and of his family. The project relied on a whole range of approaches: Otdelnov studied archival photos and newspaper clippings, personal notes, essays and documents, met with environmental experts and former factory workers, he wandered around the exclusion zones, factory ruins, the overgrown workers’ camp. Through various media — painting, photography, video, installation, texts, ready-made objects — the project offers both a historical and personal perspective on the era that had finally passed.  The exhibition was supplemented with excerpts from published memoires by workers and engineers of Dzerzhink’s many plants as well as from No Entry Without Gas Mask, a book authored by the artist’s father Alexander Otdelnov.
Parts of the project were presented at exhibitions at the Stavropol Regional Museum of Fine Arts ; Belyaevo Gallery, Moscow;  Arsenal Center for Contemporary Art, Nizhny Novgorod;  Victoria Gallery, Samara;  main program of the 4th Ural Industrial Biennale of Contemporary Art, Ekaterinburg; FUTURO Gallery, Nizhny Novgorod;  Oktava Creative Industrial Cluster, Tula. In 2019, the project was displayed in full at the Moscow Museum of Modern Art.  Otdelnov’s Promzona received the Innovation Award in 2020 and was short listed for the Kandinsky Prize in 2021. An abridged version was on display from February till March 2022 at the Uppsala Art Museum, Sweden.

Ringing trace, 2021 

In the fall of 2021, invited by the Ural Industrial Biennale of Contemporary Art, Otdelnov created a project about the history of the nuclear industry in the Southern Urals. The project was exhibited at the former dormitory of the secret Laboratory B in the village of Sokol, Chelyabinsk Region. During the Soviet time, the lab studied radiobiology, but over the recent few decades the dorms have been vacant and in disrepair. The artist structured the exposition as a parallel alternative to that of a local history museum. Alongside the newly created paintings, the exhibits included found documents and records, which resonated deeply with Pavel. Each of the 21 rooms in the exhibition narrates the different aspects in the history of the nuclear industry: the invention of the atomic bomb, the 1957 explosion at the Mayak Facility and its liquidators, the Chelyabinsk radioactive trace and the villages that it killed, the secret lingo of nuclear scientists and the daily life in closed towns, the poisoned Techa River, which had been receiving dumps of heavy radioactive waste in 1949–1952 while the riverside population continued to use its water. The project was deemed a success by both the audience and critics, and recognized as one of the best at the Biennale. Despite its remote location, the exposition was visited by many people from all across Russia, and upon completion of the Biennale program it was decided to make the exhibit permanent. The exposition became officially permanent in 2022.

War

Unheimlich, 2015 

In 2015, when the war in Eastern Ukraine was already ongoing, Otdelnov built an installation titled Unheimlich for the War Museum exhibition at the Moscow Museum of Modern Art. A typical cozy room with a carpet, a floor lamp and an armchair was supplemented with subtle details that marked the presence of war: a toy tank coming from behind the armchair, armed soldiers hiding in the floral patterns of the carpet. Where does one discover the nostalgia for past greatness? the artist wonders. Might it be possible that we, following Freud, should look for the unheimlich in the homely, habitual, lived-in?  Additionally and as a reference to Martha Rosler’s Bring the War Home, the artist makes a series of photographic collages that juxtaposed the interiors of his relatives’ apartments and the views of the cities ravaged by the war in the Donetsk Region. Examining a photo of the destroyed airport in Donetsk, Otdelnov painted No Flights Today that captures the devastating horror of war and the proximity of death.

Field of Experiments and Hands of War, 2022 
In February 2022, Otdelnov spoke out openly against Russia’s military invasion of Ukraine. During the spring of 2022, he makes a series of drawings, titled Hands of War, based on photos from war correspondents and public events that were being held in support of Vladimir Putin’s policies in Russia. In March–April 2022, he made a series of watercolors titled Field of Experiments that was exhibited at the Kalmar Art Museum in Sweden in the summer of 2022. All the watercolors depict a deserted snowy field where isolated images appear here and there: a concrete fence, a checkpoint, a red carpet, a burnt-down house, naked human figures drowning in the snow. The name of this series is a reference to a famous song by the Russian rock band Grazhdanskaya Oborona (Civil Defense), titled Russian Filed of Experiments, an absurdist and terrifying text about cruelty and death. These watercolors present metaphorical images that are, in artist’s view, instrumental in comprehending the unfolding events.

Others 
In cooperation with Kovcheg gallery Otdelnov displayed his works on Personal acquaintance exhibition within the Parallel Programme of the 3rd Moscow Biennale of Contemporary Art in 2009 and contemporary art fairs in Cologne in 2010 and 2011. Throughout the 2011 Russia-Spain Year of Culture Otdelnov's personal exhibitions took place in Madrid, Alcala de Henares and Esquivias.
In 2013 Pavel Otdelnov's artworks were shortlisted for Strabag Artaward International. In 2013—2015 Otdelnov participated in several exhibitions organized by the Institute of Contemporary Art, including collaborative projects with Goldsmith College. On the “Perception transfers. From analog to digital” exhibition Otdelnov presented an installation that combined an artwork based upon Google Street View image with open laptop, placed over the table easel.

In 2014, Otdelnov provided artworks for Smile&Christie's charity auction. In 2015 Otdelnov participated in the Portrait Now! competition for Brewer J. C. Jacobsen's Portrait Award and participated in two exhibition in Russia's major museums: Tretyakov Gallery presented his paintings in “Metageography. Space — Image — Action” special project of the 6th Moscow biennial of contemporary art while State Russian Museum picked his artworks for “Russia. Realism. XXI century” exhibition.

Selected exhibitions, works in collections

Personal exhibitions 
 2005 — Canvas. Time. Space, Chamber of Commerce, Dzerzhinsk
 2006 — The way home, Central Exhibitions Hall, Nizhny Novgorod
 2010 — 2012 — Otra Cotidianidad, series of exhibitions (Quinta del Berro cultural center, Madrid; Casa de los Picos, Segovia; Juana Frances hall, Madrid; Museo Casa Natal de Cervantes, Alcala de Henares; Nicholas Salmeron cultural center, Madrid; Casa de Cervantes, Eskivias; Centro Ruso de Ciencia y Cultura, Madrid)
 2012 — Neon landscape, Art.Ru Agency, Moscow
 2014 — Inner Degunino, Moscow Museum of Modern Art, Moscow
 2014 — The First Principle of Dialectics (joint exhibition with Egor Plotnikov), Open Club Gallery, Moscow
 2014 — No man's land (join exhibition with Julia Malinina, within the Parallel Programme of the 4th Moscow International Biennale for Young Art), Grinberg Gallery, Moscow
 2015 — Hall of fame, Stavropol Arts Museum, Stavropol
 2015 — Mall, Triumph Gallery, Moscow
 2016 — Territory of accumulated damage, Belyaevo Gallery, Moscow
 2016 — “Deserts“. 2002 — 2017, Belyaevo Gallery, Moscow
 2016 — White sea. Black hole, Arsenal national center for contemporary arts, Nizhny Novgorod
 2016 — Mall. Time of Colorful Sheds, Centre of Contemporary Culture SMENA, Kazan
 2017 — Ruins, Victoria Art Gallery, Samara
 2018 — Chemical Plant, FUTURO Gallery, Nizhny Novgorod
 2018 — Factory Anecdotes, Creative Industrial Cluster Oktava, Tula
 2019 — Promzona, Moscow Museum of Modern Art, Moscow
 2021 — Russian Nowhere,  Triumph Gallery, Moscow
 2021 — Russian Nowhere, The Art Gallery of Boris Yeltsin Presidential Center, Yekaterinburg
 2021 — Ringing Trace, within the Artist-in-Residence program of the 6th Ural Industrial Biennale of Contemporary Art, company dormitory of the Laboratory B, Sokol village, Chelyabinsk region
 2022 — Promzona, Uppsala konstmuseum, Uppsala, Sweden
 2022 — The Field of Experiments, Kalmar konstmuseum, Sweden
 2022 — Acting Out, Pushkin house, London, United Kingdom

Group exhibitions 

 2006 — The Present Time, Kovcheg Gallery, Moscow; “Nonactual art”, Moscow Union of Artists exhibition hall, Moscow
 2007 — Personal acquaintance (within the Parallel Programme of the 3rd Moscow Biennale for Contemporary Art), Kovcheg Gallery, Moscow
 2010 — The Dialogue. Pavel Nikonov and Young Artists, Russian Academy of Arts, Moscow
 2010 — On the contrary, CCA Winzavod, Moscow
 2010 — Art sanatorium, Tretyakov Gallery, Moscow
 2011 — Russian metaphysics. Italian objectivity. The beginning of the new century, Russian Academy of Arts, Moscow
 2011 — The forms of life. Return to reality, Tretyakov Gallery, Moscow
 2012 — Combine. Retrospective (joint exposition with Egor Plotnikov), Heritage Gallery, Moscow
 2013 — Horizons, CCI Fabrika, Moscow 
 2013 — Stanzas, Erarta Gallery, St. Petersburg
 2013 — Strabag Art Award, Vienna, Austria
 2014 — Desolation of landscape, a project by “Dialogue of Arts” magazine (Art.Ru Agency, Moscow; ART re.FLEX Gallery, St. Petersburg Stroganov Chambers, Usolye)
 2014 — A Time for Dreams (Main Project of the 4th Moscow International Biennale for Young Art), Museum of Moscow 
 2014 — Perception transfers. From analog to digital, CCA Sokol, Moscow
 2014 — Landscape with the disappearance, VCCA, Voronezh
 2014 — Fortune museum, MMOMA, Moscow
 2015 — Metageography. Space — Image — Action, Tretyakov Gallery, Moscow
 2015 — No time, CCA Winzavod, Moscow (Special projects of the 6th Moscow biennale of contemporary art), Tretyakov Gallery, Moscow
 2015 — Russia. Realism. XXI century, State Russian Museum, St. Petersburg
 2015 — Expanding Space, GES-2, Moscow
 2015 — Sub observation, MMOMA, Moscow 
 2015 — Piece of Space Traversed by Mind, New Wing of Gogol Museum, Moscow
 2015 — Fest, Krasnoyarsk Museum Center, Krasnoyarsk
 2015 — Portrait Now! participants exhibition (Erarta, St. Petersburg; Frederiksborg Castle, Kopenhagen, Denmark; Ljungberg Museum, Ljungby, Sweden)
 2016 — Always modern. Always contemporary. The art of XX—XXI centuries, ROSIZO State Museum Exhibition Centre, Moscow
 2016 — Where Is Heaven on Earth, Erarta, St. Petersburg 
 2016 — Spatial Errors, GROUND Peschanaya Gallery
 2017 — New Literacy, the Main project of the 4th Ural Industrial Biennale of Contemporary Art, Yekaterinburg
 2017 — Noise of Time,  Russian Contemporary Art from Erarta Museum, Maritime Centre, Kotka, Finland
 2018 — 10/7. Collection Highlights / Display History, Moscow Museum of Modern Art, Moscow
 2018 — Metageography: Orientalism and Dreams of Robinsons, Zarya Center for Contemporary Art, Vladivostok
 2018 — Where will I be, Selected works from MMOMA Collection“, Krasnoyarsk Museum Center, Krasnoyarsk
 2018 — Art Art and Technology. Pros and Cons, the main project of the VIII International Tashkent Biennale of Contemporary, Central Exhibition Hall of the Academy of Arts of Uzbekistan, Tashkent
 2019 — Gold, Moscow Contemporary Art Center Winzavod, Moscow
 2019 — Metageography — Images of Space in the Era of Globalization, Pro art's Gallery, Kaluga
 2019 — Orienteering and Positioning The Main Project of the 8th Moscow International Biennale of Contemporary art, Tretyakov Gallery, Moscow
 2020 — Viral Self-Portraits, online exhibition, Museum of Modern Art (Ljubljana), Ljubljana, Slovenia
 2020 — Generation XXI. The gift from Vladimir Smirnov and Konstantin Sorokin, Tretyakov gallery, Moscow
 2021 — Kuzbass Now!, Tretyakov gallery, Moscow
 2021 — Socialist Realism. Metamorphosis. Soviet Art 1927 — 1987, Tretyakov Gallery, Moscow
 2021 — “AU“, Street Art Museum, Saint Petersburg
 2021 — Moscow–Seoul: Common Ideas, Museum of Moscow, Moscow
 2021 — Living Matter, Tretyakov gallery, Moscow
 2022 — Things, Center for Contemporary Art Typography, Krasnodar
 2022 — Thing. Space. Human. Art of the second half of the XX — early XXI century from the collection of the Tretyakov gallery, Tretyakov Gallery, Moscow
 2022 — Art for Sanity: Reverse Perspective of War, MANYI—Kulturális Műhely, Budapest, Hungary
 2022 — Overwhelming Majority?, Shtager gallery, London

Works in collections 
Otdelnov's works are included in the collections of State Russian Museum, Tretyakov Gallery, Moscow Museum of Modern Art, Uppsala Art Museum Uppsala, The Institute of Russian Realist Art (IRRA) Moscow, the National Center of Contemporary Art (NCCA) – The Pushkin Museum (Moscow), Sergey Kuryokhin Modern Art Museum, St. Petersburg, “Erarta” contemporary art museum and other Russian museums; in the collections of Russian Academy of Arts, Moscow Union of Artists, Kovcheg gallery, Gorbachev Foundation, corporate collections of RDI Group and IQ Capital, private collections in Russia, United States, Germany, Italy, Spain, Poland and other countries.

Awards 
 2015 — Kandinsky Prize long list (with the Inner Degunino project)
 2017 — The Sergey Kuryokhin Contemporary Art Award short list (with the White sea. Black hole project)
 2017 — The Sergey Kuryokhin Contemporary Art Award Special award of French Institute in St.Petersburg (with the White sea. Black hole project)
 2017 — Kandinsky Prize long list (with the White sea. Black hole project)
 2019 — Kandinsky Prize long list (with the project Psychozoic era)
 2020 — The Artist of the Year by Cosmoscow International Contemporary Art Fair
 2020 —  Winner of the Innovation Art Prize(with the Promzona project)
 2021 — Kandinsky Prize short list (with the Promzona project)

Publications 
 Daria Mille. Trajectories of Modernization in Russia: Artists Recalibrating the Sensorium. Critical Zones. Observatories for Earthly Politics. Bruno Latour, Peter Weibel. Zentrum für Kunst und Medien Karlsruhe, MIT Press, Cambridge, Massachusetts, 2020.  pp. 378-379
 Svetlana Polyakova, Marina Bobyleva, Pavel Otdelnov. RUSSIAN NOWHERE. Pavel Otdelnov. Catalog of the exhibition. 2021. Story Demands to be Continued. Triumph gallery, Moscow. 2021. 
 Konstantin Zatsepin. Энигматический пейзаж [Enigmatic Landscape] // Пространство взгляда. Искусство 2000–2010х годов [The Space of Vision. Art of the 2000–2010s]. In Russian. Samara: Book Edition, 2016, 120p. 
 Daria Kamyshnikova, Konstantin Zatsepin, Pavel Otdelnov. PROMZONA. Pavel Otdelnov, Triumph gallery, Moscow. 2019. 
 Andrey Erofeev. CHA SHA, Catalogue of the exhibition, Jart gallery, Moscow. 2021.
 Irina Kulik, Pavel Otdelnov. Mall. Pavel Otdelnov, Triumph gallery, Moscow. 2015.
 Daria Kamyshnikova. Internal Degunino. Pavel Otdelnov, Triumph gallery, Moscow. 2014.
 Valentin Diakonov. Comfort Zone. Paintings by Pavel Otdelnov. Neon Landscape. Catalog of the exhibition. ArtRu Agency, 2012.
 L. A. Zaks. Эстетическое наших дней: новая феноменология [The Aesthetic of our Times: a New Phenomenology]. Koinon. 2021. Т.2. №3. pp. 44–66. doi:10.15826/koinon.2021.02.3.027 
 P.A.Otdelnov. Художественный проект Промзона: история семьи как часть страны [The Promzona Art Project: The Family Story as a Part of the History of the Country]. Философические письма. Русско-европейский диалог. Том2 No4–2019. DOI: 10.15826/koinon.2021.02.3.027. pp. 214-241. doi:10.17323/2658-5413-2019-2-4-214-241 
 S.V. Polyakova Русское Нигде как пространство семиозиса: к истории одной выставки. [Russian Nowhere as a space of semiosis: towards the history of one exhibition]. Faculty of Philosophy, Moscow State University named after M.V. Lomonosov, Moscow, Russia, 2021. doi:10.31249/chel/2022.01.08 
 Sergei Reviakin, Edward Lucie-Smith. Russian Art in the New Millennium. Unicorn Publishing Group, 2022.

Gallery

References

External links 

 
 Website of the artist's project Promzona 
 Pavel Otdelnov included in the list of the Best contemporary Russian artists (ARTEEX)
 Pavel Otdelnov in the website of the Russian Investment Art Rating 49ART

1979 births
Living people
20th-century Russian painters
21st-century Russian painters
People from Dzerzhinsk, Russia
Russian contemporary artists
Russian landscape painters
Russian male painters
20th-century Russian male artists
21st-century Russian male artists